The St. Vincent's Hotel, at 100 North Wind in Flandreau, South Dakota, was built in 1897.  It was listed on the National Register of Historic Places in 1983.

It is a two-story U-shaped frame building on a cut stone foundation.

It was deemed notable as "an unusual, surviving example of a 19th century frame hotel."

References

Commercial buildings completed in 1897
National Register of Historic Places in Moody County, South Dakota
Hotels in South Dakota